is a 4-film series of Pinky violence pink films made by Toei during 1972 and 1973. Reiko Ike was the star of all four films, and Miki Sugimoto co-starred in the first two.

The films 
  (29 September 1972) Director: Norifumi Suzuki) 
  (31 March 1973) Director: Norifumi Suzuki) 
  (1 September 1973) Director: Masahiro Shimura) 
  (1 December 1973) Director: Masahiro Shimura)

Availability
Currently, only the second episode of the series, Terrifying Girls' High School: Lynch Law Classroom has been released on region-1 DVD. This film was included in the 4-disc Pinky Violence Collection released by Panik House in 2005.

Sources
 
 
 
 
  (booklet in the Pinky Violence Collection)
 Japanese Movie Database
 

Pornographic film series
Pink films
Toei Company films
Juvenile delinquency in fiction
1970s Japanese films